Henry Jermyn, 1st Earl of Saint Albans,  (25 March 1605 (baptised) – January 1684) was an English politician and courtier. He sat in the House of Commons at various times between 1625 and 1643 when he was raised to the peerage as Baron Jermyn. He was one of the most influential courtiers of the period, constantly devising and promoting schemes to involve foreign powers in the restoration of the monarchy, both before and after the execution of Charles I.

Biography
Jermyn was the fourth but second surviving son of Sir Thomas Jermyn (1572–1645) of Rushbrooke, Suffolk, Vice-Chamberlain to Charles I, and his wife Catherine, daughter of Sir William Killigrew of Hanworth, Middlesex (a sister of Sir Robert). He was baptised at St Margaret's Lothbury, London on 25 March 1605.

In 1625 Jermyn was elected Member of Parliament for Bodmin, and was re-elected MP for the seat in 1626. He was MP for Liverpool in 1628. He won the favour of Henrietta Maria of France, Queen consort of Charles I of England whose vice-chamberlain he became in 1628, and Master of the Horse in 1639.

In April 1640, Jermyn was elected MP for Corfe Castle in the Short Parliament together with his brother Thomas. The brothers were both elected MPs for Bury St Edmunds in the Long Parliament in November 1640 and were active and ardent Royalists. Jermyn took a prominent part in the First Army Plot of 1641, and on its discovery fled to France. Returning to the Kingdom of England in 1643, he resumed his personal attendance on the queen. He was raised to the peerage as Baron Jermyn of St Edmundsbury on 6 September, ostensibly so that, should he fall into Parliamentarian hands, he would be beheaded, and not hanged, drawn and quartered. He accompanied Henrietta Maria in 1644 to France, where he continued to act as her secretary.

Also in 1643, Jermyn was made governor of Jersey, whence he conducted the Prince of Wales to Paris. When Charles II went to Breda, Jermyn remained in Paris with Henrietta Maria, who persuaded her son to create him Earl of St Albans in 1660. Gossip which the historian Hallam accepted as authentic, but which is supported by no real evidence, asserted that Jermyn was secretly married to the widow of Charles I. It has further been rumoured that he may have been the true father of at least one of her children, even perhaps of Charles II himself: for example, the Domestic State Papers for 13 August 1660 contain a report by Capt. Francis Robinson of Nathaniel Angelo, a Windsor clergyman, asserting that 'all the royal children were Jermyn's bastards'.

At the Restoration St Albans became Lord Chamberlain, and received other appointments. He supported the policy of friendship with France, and he contributed largely to the close secret understanding between Charles II and Louis XIV of France, arranging the preliminaries of the Treaty of Dover in 1669.

In the early 1660s, he obtained a grant of land in London north of St James's Palace, building St James's Square and its surrounding streets, including Jermyn Street, and also St Albans market, on a site afterwards cleared for the construction of Regent Street and Waterloo Place. It was a grand design in itself, and from its inspiration grew the whole of the West End of London, so much so that the Survey of London (volume 29) acknowledges Henry Jermyn as the 'Father of the West End'.

He was a friend and patron of Abraham Cowley and Sir William Davenant. Although accused of having 'dissolute morals', he was really no more or less 'moral' than most other men of his time. He was much addicted to gambling, which was a very popular pastime in his era.

St Albans died in St James Square in January 1684. As he was unmarried, the earldom became extinct at his death, while the barony of Jermyn of St Edmundsbury passed by special remainder, together with his property, to his nephew Thomas Jermyn (1633–1703), and after the latter's death to Thomas's brother Henry Baron Dover.

Notes

References

Attribution:

 

Saint Albans, Henry Jermyn, 1st Earl of
Saint Albans, Henry Jermyn, 1st Earl of
Saint Albans, Henry Jermyn, 1st Earl of
Saint Albans, Henry Jermyn, 1st Earl of
Jermyn, Henry 1st Earl of Saint Albans
Members of the pre-1707 English Parliament for constituencies in Cornwall
Ambassadors of England to the Netherlands
17th-century English diplomats
English MPs 1625
English MPs 1626
English MPs 1628–1629
English MPs 1640 (April)
English MPs 1640–1648
Jermyn family
People from Rushbrooke with Rougham
Earls of St Albans
1
Members of the Parliament of England (pre-1707) for Liverpool